Mhairi Black (or /vaɾʲɪ/ in Scottish Gaelic born 12 September 1994) is a Scottish National Party (SNP) politician, serving as the party's deputy leader in the House of Commons since December 2022. She has been a Member of Parliament (MP) for Paisley and Renfrewshire South since 2015, when she defeated Labour's Shadow Foreign Secretary Douglas Alexander. She was re-elected in 2017 and again in 2019.

When elected in May 2015, she was 20 years and 237 days old, making her the youngest MP elected to the House of Commons since the Reform Act of 1832, the previous record having been held by William Wentworth-Fitzwilliam, who was 20 years and 11 months old when elected in 1832.

Black was the Baby of the House as the youngest member of the House from 2015 to 2019 when Labour MP Nadia Whittome, who was aged 23 at the time of her election to the House of Commons, was elected at the 2019 election; Black remains the SNP's youngest MP.

Early life
Born in Paisley in 1994, Black was educated at Lourdes Secondary School, Glasgow, and the University of Glasgow, where she was awarded a first-class honours degree in Politics and Public Policy in June 2015. At the date of her election in 2015, she had not completed her undergraduate degree, with a final exam on Scottish politics still to be undertaken.

Career before politics 
Before entering politics, Black worked in a fish and chip shop and volunteered at Oxfam Music.

Political career

Black became a member of Parliament for Paisley and Renfrewshire South in the 2015 general election while still a final year undergraduate student at the University of Glasgow. Her defeat of Douglas Alexander, a Labour MP and Shadow Foreign Secretary, was described as unexpected and an example of a collapse of popularity for the Labour Party in Scotland at the 2015 election.

Although she was reported to be the youngest MP since Christopher Monck, Earl of Torrington, who entered the House of Commons at the age of 13 in 1667, Monck was followed by other teenagers until the Parliamentary Elections Act 1695 established 21 as the minimum age of candidacy. Furthermore, until the Reform Act 1832, underage MPs were seldom unseated, with Viscount Jocelyn being 18 when elected in the 1806 general election. Since the Electoral Administration Act 2006 reduced the age of candidacy from 21 to 18 years, Black is the first person to be elected under its provisions.

On 1 July 2015, it was announced that Black had been appointed to the Work and Pensions Select Committee. She made her maiden speech on 14 July 2015 and this included some criticism of the government's approach to unemployment in her constituency and the growing need for food banks. She said, "Food banks are not part of the welfare state. They are a symbol that the welfare state is failing." Black also criticised the government over cuts to housing benefit. Within five days of her giving this speech, it had been viewed over 10 million times on various media. Black was later made aware of the change in the state pension through her constituents, and has since endorsed Women Against State Pension Inequality (WASPI) on several occasions.

Black is a longstanding critic of Westminster. Two months after her election, she commented that the practice of making MPs vote in person, instead of electronically, was "outdated and wasted time". In a 2016 interview with Owen Jones, Black labelled Westminster as an "old boys' club" and "so excluded from reality", while expressing concern about the arrogance and sexism from other MPs.

At a public meeting in November 2016 in Aberdeenshire, Black said of the EU referendum: "If I'm honest, there was an element of holding my nose a bit when I voted Remain." One member of the audience told The Daily Telegraph, "I'm not sure she would have said it in Glasgow. She was sitting in the most Eurosceptic corner of Scotland."

She also dismissed the claim of the pro-independence campaign in 2014 that Scots would be £5,000 better off if they voted Yes as "mythical".

In 2017, Black considered not standing for a second term in the next general election, expressing her frustration that "so little gets done", and that "it is a pain to come up and down every week".

Despite this, Black decided to stand at the 2017 general election and, despite a backlash among voters to Sturgeon's plans for a second independence referendum, was re-elected with a reduced majority. She told BBC Scotland that she's "glad to be re-elected to go back down and continue to batter into whoever is in government that austerity is not working, it's not benefiting people's lives whatsoever. The people it is benefiting, you could argue, are the ones who need it least."

In April 2017 Black was heckled by protestors who were angry at the decision of the Scottish Government to close the sick children's ward at the Royal Alexandra Hospital in her constituency. One local parent told the press, "I am not at all happy. Ward 15 saved my little boy's life when he was only five days old. It's about children's lives".

In September 2017, Black was placed at Number 77 in 'The 100 Most Influential People on the Left' by commentator Iain Dale – a fall of 18 places on the previous year, which Dale attributed to the view that: "Her second year in Parliament has been quieter than her first."

In January 2018, Black was a signatory for a Safer Drugs Consumption Facility (SDCF) pilot scheme in Glasgow.

Black has since October 2015 received £150 per week from Newsquest Media (Herald & Times) Ltd, for a column in The National.

Black stood again in the 2019 general election as the SNP candidate for Paisley & Renfrewshire South and was elected with over half the vote, increasing her majority to 10,679 votes or 24.8% - more than double that in the 2015 election.

In March 2020, it was reported that Black had a "blazing row" with her fellow SNP MP Joanna Cherry, after the latter questioned her decision to visit a primary school with a drag queen.

In December 2022 she became deputy leader of the SNP at Westminster.

Political views
Black describes herself as a "traditional socialist", citing Tony Benn as her enduring political hero - despite his opposition to Scottish independence. Her other political inspirations include Keir Hardie and Margo MacDonald.

Black is a strong critic of the Conservative government's rollout of Universal Credit, maintaining that delays in payments have serious negative effects on claimants and she is critical of how loans must be paid back later.  Black said in Parliament that the government was like a "pious loan shark – except that instead of coming through your front door they are coming after your mental health, your physical well-being, your stability, your sense of security – that is what the experience is for all of our constituents". She added, "Plunging people into debt does not incentivise work, forcing people into hunger does not incentivise work, causing anxiety and distress and even evicting some families from their homes does not incentivise work."

Personal life
In line with prevailing political sentiment, Black expressed her support for same-sex marriage prior to the referendum in Ireland. She identifies as a lesbian. Asked about her decision to "come out", she replied "I've never been in". In June 2022, Black married her partner, Katie, at a ceremony at Pollokshields Burgh Hall in Glasgow.

According to The Tablet she is a Catholic. Despite this, Black has said that she is "not religious" although she "reads her Bible".

She is a supporter and season-ticket holder of Partick Thistle F.C. She plays the guitar and piano, as was revealed in a Channel 4 News interview with Jon Snow, on 18 September 2015, during which she played the theme music from the film Titanic.

Notes
 Black's forename is a Scottish Gaelic form of 'Mary'. However, Black says that her name is a homophone of the word marry.  was the pronunciation chosen by Deputy Speaker Eleanor Laing on the occasion of her maiden speech.

References

External links

BBC Radio 4 Profile
SNP profile

|-

1994 births
Living people
21st-century Scottish women politicians
21st-century Scottish politicians
Alumni of the University of Glasgow
Catholic socialists
Female members of the Parliament of the United Kingdom for Scottish constituencies
LGBT Roman Catholics
LGBT members of the Parliament of the United Kingdom
Scottish LGBT politicians
Lesbian politicians
Members of the Parliament of the United Kingdom for Paisley constituencies
People educated at Lourdes Secondary School
Politicians from Paisley, Renfrewshire
Scottish National Party MPs
Scottish Roman Catholics
Scottish socialists
UK MPs 2015–2017
UK MPs 2017–2019
UK MPs 2019–present